Barber is an English and Norman French surname. The relative names: Barbieri (Italian), Barbero (Italian and Spanish), Barbeiro (Portuguese), Barbier (French) all came from the Greek Surnames: Barberis or Barberopoulos which means Barber. Notable people with the surname include:

A
 A. B. Barber (1883–1961), American Army colonel
 Adrian Barber (1938–2020), British musician/producer
 Alan Barber (1905–1985), English amateur first-class cricketer
 Alden G. Barber (1919–2003), Boy Scouts of America figure
 Aleesha Barber (born 1987), Trinidadian sprint hurdler
 Alf Barber (1902–1967), British boxer
 Allison Barber, American university chancellor
 Amos W. Barber (1861–1915), American surgeon and politician
 Amzi L. Barber (1843–1909), American pioneer of the asphalt industry
 Andrea Barber (born 1976), American actress
 Anthony Barber, Baron Barber (1920–2005), British cabinet minister
 Antonia Barber (1932–2019), English author
 Arthur Barber (1898 – after 1925), English cricketer
 Augustus Barber (1927–2008), American businessman and founder of Barber Foods
 Ava Barber (born 1954), American country music singer and performer

B
 Ben Barber (born 1984), Australian actor
 Benjamin Barber (1939–2017), American political scientist
 Bill Barber (born 1952), Canadian hockey player
 Bill Barber (musician) (1920–2007), jazz musician
 Billy Barber (musician), American keyboardist and composer
 Bob Barber (disambiguation), multiple people, including:
Bob Barber (cricketer) (born 1935), English cricketer
Bob Barber (American football) (born 1951), American footballer
Bob Barber (ice hockey) (born 1943), Canadian professional ice hockey player
Bob Barber (rugby union) (born 1945), New Zealand rugby union player
 Bobby Barber (1894–1976), American character actor
 Brian Barber (born 1973), baseball starting pitcher
 Sir Brendan Barber (born 1951), General Secretary of the Trades Union Congress, United Kingdom
 Bruce Barber (born 1950), New Zealand-born artist, writer, curator and educator
 Bryan Barber (born 1970), American music video and motion picture director

C
 Celeste Barber, Australian comedian and journalist 
 Catharine Webb Barber (1823 – ?), American newspaper editor, author
 Charles Barber (disambiguation), multiple people, including:
Charles Barber (artist) (–1854), English landscape painter and art teacher
Charles Barber (author) (born 1962), American author on mental health and psychiatry
Charles Barber (brigadier) (1888–1965), Army officer
Charles Alfred Barber (1860–1933), British botanist
Charles Arnold Barber (1848–1915), Canadian architect and inventor
Charles Burton Barber (1845–1894), English painter
C. Chapman Barber (1803–1882), English lawyer
Charles E. Barber (1840–1917), Chief Engraver of the United States Mint
Charles I. Barber (1887–1962), American architect
 Charlie Barber (1854–1910), American baseball player
 Chris Barber (disambiguation), multiple people, including:
Chris Barber (1930–2021), English jazz bandleader and trombonist
Chris Barber (gridiron football) (born 1964), American football player
Chris Barber (philanthropist) (1921–2012), Chair of Oxfam 1983–89
Chris Barber (disambiguation) (born 1973), American businessman
Christopher Barber (painter) (1736–1810), English miniature painter
 Clarence Barber (1917–2004), Canadian economist and academic
 Sir Colin Muir Barber (1897–1964), British general

D
 Dan Barber (born 1969), American chef and restaurant owner
 Daniel Barber (disambiguation), multiple people, including:
Daniel Barber (director), British screen director
Daniel Barber (minister) (1756–1834), American Episcopalian minister
 Danny Barber (soccer) (born 1971), American soccer player
 Darren Barber (born 1968), Canadian rower
 David Barber (disambiguation), multiple people, including:
David Barber (cricketer) (born 1937), English cricketer
David G. Barber, Canadian scientist and academic 
 Del Barber (born 1983), Canadian country singer
 Derek Barber, Baron Barber of Tewkesbury (1918–2017), agricultural expert
 Dick Barber (1910–1983), American long jumper
 Dominic Barber (1955–2003), English theatre director
 Dominique Barber (born 1986), American football player
 Don Barber (born 1964), Canadian-born ice hockey player
 Donn Barber (1871–1925), American architect
 Douglas Barber, Canadian businessman

E
 Edward Barber (disambiguation), multiple people, including:
Edward Barber (actor) (born 2000), British-Filipino actor
Edward Barber (VC) (1893–1915), British soldier during World War I and Victoria Cross recipient
Edward Barber (minister) (died c. 1674), English Baptist minister
Edward Barber (priest) (1841–1914), Anglican clergyman
Edward Thaddeus Barleycorn Barber (1865–1948), Methodist minister on the island of Fernando Po
 Edwin Atlee Barber (1851–1916), American archeologist and author
 Elizabeth Wayland Barber, American author, expert on textiles, professor emerita of archaeology and linguistics
 Eric Barber (1942–2014),  Irish professional soccer player
 Eric Barber (cricketer) (1915–1995), English cricketer
 Eric Arthur Barber (1888–1965), English classicist
 Ernie Barber (disambiguation), multiple people, including:
Ernie Barber (American football) (1914–1989), American football player
Ernie Barber (Australian footballer) (1895–1972), Australian rules footballer
 Eunice Barber (born 1974), Sierra Leonean athlete

F
 Forest Barber (born 1952), American racing driver
 Frances Barber (born 1958), English actress
 Francis Barber (–1801), Jamaican manservant of Samuel Johnson from 1752 until Johnson's death in 1784
 Francis Barber (Colonel) (1750–1783), colonel in the Continental Army during the American Revolutionary War
 Fred Barber (born 1963), English soccer player
 Frederick Barber (cricketer) (1887–1943), English cricketer

G
 Gary Barber (born 1957), chairman and CEO of Metro-Goldwyn-Mayer, film producer and co-founder of Spyglass Entertainment
 George Barber (disambiguation), multiple people, including:
George Barber (artist) (born 1958) Guyana-born video artist
George Anthony Barber (1802–1874), English-born Canadian educator
George W. Barber, American race car driver
 Gillian Barber (born 1958), English-born Canadian actress
 Glenn Barber (1935–2008), American country and rockabilly performer
 Glynis Barber (born 1955), British actress
 Graham Barber (born 1958), English soccer referee
 Greg Barber (born 1966), Australian politician

H
 Hamish Barber (1933–2007), Scottish doctor
 Harold Wordsworth Barber (1887–1955), English dermatologist
 Harriet Barber (1968–2014), English figurative painter
 Harry James Barber (1875–1959), Canadian politician
 Herbert Spencer Barber (1882–1950), American entomologist
 Henry Barber (disambiguation), multiple people, including:
Henry Barber (cricketer) (1841–1924), English cricketer
Henry Barber (rock climber) (born 1953), American rock climber
Henry Barber (sea captain) (18th century), British sea captain who discovered McKean Island
Sir Henry Barber, 1st Baronet (1860–1927), British property developer
 Hilia Barber, Bissau-Guinean politician
 Hiram Barber (1800–1888), American politician, pioneer and businessman
 Hiram Barber Jr. (1835–1924), American politician
 Homer G. Barber (1830–1909), American politician
 Horatio Barber (1875–1964), British aviation pioneer
 Horatio Barber (cricketer) (1843–1869), English cricketer
 Howard Barber (1877–1950), English-born Australian politician

I
 Irén Barbér (Irena Barber) (1939–2006), Slovene author, journalist and notary in Hungary
 Irving K. Barber (1923–2012), Canadian forest industrialist and philanthropist
 Isaac Ambrose Barber (1852–1909), American politician

J
 J. Allen Barber (1809–1881), American politician
 Jack Barber (1901–1961), English footballer
 James Barber (disambiguation), multiple people, including:
James Barber (author) (1923–2007), Canadian author
James Barber (biochemist) (1940–2020), British professor of biochemistry at Imperial College London
James Barber (politician) (1921–2001), Pennsylvania politician
James Barber (rugby), New Zealand rugby footballer who represented New Zealand in rugby league
James A. Barber (1841–1925), American soldier in the American Civil War
James David Barber (1930–2004), political scientist
 Jamie Barber, British restaurateur
 Janette Barber (born 1953), American stand-up comic, television producer and writer
 Jason Barber (born 1966), English farmer
 Jenni Barber (born 1983), American actress
 Jerry Barber (1916–1994), American professional golfer
 Jesse Barber (1888–1959), American baseball player
 Jesse Max Barber (1878–1949), African-American journalist, teacher and dentist
 Jill Barber (born 1980), Canadian singer-songwriter
 Jim Barber (disambiguation), multiple people, including:
Jim Barber (American football) (1912–1998), American football player
Jim Barber (ventriloquist), American ventriloquist, comedian and singer
 Joel Barber (1876–1952), American architect
 John Barber (disambiguation), multiple people, including:
John Barber (basketball) (born 1927), American professional basketball player
John Barber (clergyman) (died 1549), English clergyman
John Barber (cricketer) (1849–1908), English cricketer
John Barber (engineer)  (1734–1801), English coalmaster and inventor
John Barber (racing driver) (1929–2015), American Formula One driver
John P. Barber, American electrical engineer
John Roaf Barber (1841–1917), Canadian industrialist and politician
John Warner Barber (1798–1885), American writer and illustrator
 José María Chiquillo Barber (born 1964), Spanish politician
 Joseph Barber (1757–1811), English landscape painter and art teacher
 Joseph L. Barber (1864–1940), American politician
 Joshua Barber (born 1977), American artist
 Josiah Barber (1771–1842), first mayor of Ohio City, Ohio, US

K
 Karen Barber (born 1961), English ice dancer
 Karin Barber (born 1949), British anthropologist and academic
 Kate Barber (born 1976), American field hockey player
 Kantroy Barber (born 1973), American footballer
 Katherine Barber (1959–2021), Canadian lexicographer
 Keith Barber (disambiguation), multiple people, including:
Keith Barber (drummer) (1947–2005), London-born drummer
Keith Barber (footballer) (born 1947), English soccer player
Keith Barber (geographer) (1944–2017), British geographer
 Kimberly Barber (born 1959), Canadian mezzo-soprano and vocal pedagogue
 Kris Barber, Canadian ice dancer
 Kurt Barber (born 1969), American Football player and coach

L
 Laird Howard Barber (1848–1928), American politician
 Lakia Aisha Barber (born 1987), American basketball player
 Leeonzer Barber (born 1966), American boxer
Leila Cook Barber (1903–1984) American art historian and Professor Emeritus at Vassar College.
 Len Barber (1929–1988), English soccer player
 Lesley Barber (born 1968), Canadian composer
 Levi Barber (1777–1833), American surveyor, court administrator, banker and legislator
 Lionel Barber (born 1955), English journalist
 Lloyd Barber (1932–2011), Canadian university administrator
 Lucius Israel Barber (1806–1899), American politician
 Lynn Barber (born 1944), British journalist
 Lynn Barber (make-up artist), American make-up artist

M
 Malcolm Barber (born 1943), British scholar of medieval history
 Margaret Barber (1869–1901), English Christian writer
 Margaret E. Barber (1866–1930), English missionary in China
 Marion Barber Jr. (born 1959), American football player
 Marion Barber III (1983–2022), American football player
 Matthew Barber (born 1977), Canadian singer-songwriter
 Mark Barber (1915–1975), American Football player
 Mary Barber (disambiguation), multiple people, including:
Mary Barber (poet) ( – ), English poet
Mary Barber (bacteriologist) (1911–1965), British pathologist and bacteriologist
Mary Elizabeth Barber (1818–1899), British-born pioneering amateur woman scientist
 Matt Barber (actor) (born 1983), English actor
 Me'Lisa Barber (born 1980), American track and field sprint athlete
 Merrill P. Barber (1910–1985), American politician
 Michael Barber (disambiguation), multiple people, including:
Sir Michael Barber (educationist) (born 1955), British educationist
Michael C. Barber (born 1954), Roman Catholic bishop of Oakland
Michael Barber (chemist) (1934–1991), developer of fast atom bombardment
Michael Barber (academic) (born 1947), Australian mathematician, physicist and academic
Michael Barber (rapper) (born 1980), American rapper
Michael Barber (wide receiver) (born 1967), American football wide receiver
Mike Barber (tight end) (born 1953), American football tight end and minister
Mike Barber (linebacker) (born 1971), American football linebacker
 Mikele Barber (born 1980), American track and field sprint athlete
 Miller Barber (1931–2013), American golfer

N
 Nicole Barber-Lane (born 1970), English actress
 Noel Barber (1909–1988), British novelist and journalist
 Nola Barber (1901–1985), Australian mayor and community worker
 Noyes Barber (1781–1844), American politician

O
 O. C. Barber (1841–1920), American businessman, industrialist and philanthropist
 Orion M. Barber (1857–1930), American politician

P
 Patricia Barber (born 1956), American jazz singer
 Paul Barber (disambiguation), multiple people, including:
Paul Barber (actor) (born 1951), English actor
Paul Barber (bishop) (born 1935), English bishop
Paul Barber (field hockey) (born 1955), English field hockey player
Paul Barber (soccer administrator), English soccer administrator
 Peter J. Barber (1830–1905), American architect who was mayor of Santa Barbara, Ca
 Peyton Barber (born 1994), American football player
 Phil Barber (born 1965), English soccer player
 Polly Barber (1803–1898), Canadian teacher, farmer and businesswoman

R
 Ray Barber (1923–2009), singer
 Red Barber (1908–1992), American sports broadcaster
 Richard Barber (born 1941), British historian
 Riley Barber (born 1994), American ice hockey player
 Rina Foygel Barber, American statistician
 Ron Barber (born 1945), American politician
 Ronde Barber (born 1975), American football player (twin brother of Tiki)
 Russell Barber, American curler

S
 Samuel Barber (1910–1981), American composer
 Skip Barber (born 1936), American Formula One driver
 Steve Barber (1938–2007), American professional baseball player
 Steve Barber (right-handed pitcher) (born 1948), American baseball player

T
 Tiki Barber (born 1975), American football player (twin brother of Ronde)
 Tommy Barber (1886–1925), English footballer
 Trevor Barber (1925–2015), New Zealand cricketer

W
 Whitman A. Barber (1853–1930), American politician
 William Barber (disambiguation), multiple people, including:
William Barber (engraver) (1807–1879), Chief Engraver for the U.S. Mint
William Barber (Ontario politician) (1808–1887), Canadian businessman and politician
William Swinden Barber (1832–1908), English architect
William Barber II (born 1963), minister and social activist

Fictional
 Justin Barber, fictional character on the American soap opera The Bold and the Beautiful
 Little Miss Barber, advertising character for some brands of tea

Notes

English-language surnames
Catalan-language surnames
Occupational surnames
English-language occupational surnames